Cebu's 1st congressional district is one of the seven congressional districts of the Philippines in the province of Cebu. It has been represented in the House of Representatives of the Philippines since 1916 and earlier in the Philippine Assembly from 1907 to 1916. The district consists of the cities of Carcar, Naga and Talisay and the municipalities of Minglanilla, San Fernando and Sibonga. It is currently represented in the 19th Congress by Rhea Gullas of the Nacionalista Party (NP).

Representation history

Election results

2022

2019

2016

2013

2010

See also
Legislative districts of Cebu

References

Congressional districts of the Philippines
Politics of Cebu
1907 establishments in the Philippines
Congressional districts of Central Visayas
Constituencies established in 1907